Kamel Jdayni Houari (born 13 May 1980 in Le Kremlin-Bicêtre), better known as Kamelancien later shortened into Kamelanc', is a francophone rapper of Moroccan oujda origin. He grew up in Le Kremlin-Bicêtre, a town in the suburbs of Paris.

Discography

Albums
as Kamelancien

as Kamelanc'

Mixtapes
as Kamelancien

Singles
as Kamelanc'

featured in

See also
 North African communities of Paris

References

French rappers
Moroccan rappers
1980 births
Living people
French people of Moroccan descent
People from Val-de-Marne